Nawan Kalli() is a village and a union council located in the Mardan District of Khyber Pakhtunkhwa. Situated on an altitude of 291 m (958 feet), Nawan Kalli and Toru are also known as Bukhara Sani because they produce many religious scholars. People from Afghanistan and Central Asia come here to seek religious knowledge from these scholars and ulema. The people of Nawan Kalli are divided into different castes: Shiekhan, Tabiban, Rawani, Kumbaran and Kashmiryan among many others.

Location
Nawan Kalli is located south of Mardan, surrounded by two perennial nullahs called Kalpani and Balar; which former descends down from the heights of Malakand to the plains of this vast, fertile tract, while the latter flows downstream from the adjacent district of Swabi. Nawan Kali Mardan is next to Ghāgaraī and is located in North-West Frontier Province.

Inhabitants
Most of the residents in the region are landowners and farmers. The inhabitants of Nawan Kalli are primarily composed of Shiekhan, Rawanri, and Hakeeman Pashtun, tracing their origins to Central Asia and Afghanistan. A large portion of the residents from the village work in the Middle East and Europe, others are permanently settled here.

Sports
The most popular sports of this area are cricket, badminton, volleyball, football and table tennis. Many squash champions like Jansher Khan and Jahangir Khan have roots in this village.

References

Populated places in Mardan District